Nitza Tufiño was born in Mexico City in 1949 and is a visual artist.

Background 
She grew up in Puerto Rico. In her youth, she learned graphic arts whiled working with her father, the painter Rafael Tufiño. During her time at Academia de San Carlos, Tufiño met and was inspired by David Alfaro Siqueiros. After earning a B.F.A. from the Universidad Nacional Autónoma de México, she moved to New York City.

Artwork 
In 1969, together with a group of artists, educators and activists, Tufiño founded El Museo del Barrio. The museum's façade was the site of her first public mural.  Tufiño's ceramic murals have been commissioned for a number of public locations including the 103rd Street and Lexington Avenue subway station, the Third Street Music School, and LaGuardia Community College. Tufino's ceramic mural for P.S. 12 depicts scenes from Brooklyn's West Indian Day Parade, held annually on Labor Day.

Awards 
She has received numerous awards including one from the Puerto Rican Legal Defense and Education Fund, the 1991 “Outstanding Puerto Rican Professional in the Arts Awards” from the Office of Andrew Stein, New York City Council President and the Association of Hispanic Arts, as well as grants and fellowships from the New York State Council on the Arts and the National Endowment for the Arts.
Tufiño's commitment to public art led her to be recognized as El Taller Boricua's first female artist in 1970, and has been involved with El Taller since that time. Nitza is also a member of “El Consejo Grafico”, a national coalition of Latino printmaking workshops and individual printmakers.

References

Further reading 
 Espinoza, Martin. (2009, Jan 06). "20 years later, subway mural project is still a source of pride for the artists." New York Times. New York Times, 06 Sept. 2009. Web. 1 Feb. 2014.
 Goldman, Shifra M. et al., eds. "Latin American artists of the USA."  Grove Art Online. Oxford Art Online. Oxford University Press. Web. 3 Feb. 2014.
 Goode-Bryant, Linda, and Nitza Tufiño. "Nitza Tufiño, Visual Artist." Artist and Influence. 13 (1994). Print.

External links
Artist homepage of Nitza Tufiño
 https://www.nitzatufino.com/about-2

1949 births
Living people
Artists from Mexico City
Puerto Rican women artists
American women ceramists
American ceramists
Artists from New York City
21st-century American women artists
21st-century ceramists